Chalcides bedriagai, commonly known as Bedriaga's skink, is a species of lizard in the family Scincidae. The species is endemic to the Iberian Peninsula. It usually lives in sandy areas with sparse vegetation and good ground cover. It can also live in open woodland and burrow into loose soil. Females of the species give birth to live young. This skink is active during day and dusk, and it is very timid. It preys on insects, spiders, slugs, and woodlice.

Etymology
Both the specific name, bedriagai, and the common name, Bedriaga's skink, are in honor of Russian herpetologist Jacques von Bedriaga.

Description
Bedriaga's skink resembles a scaled-down version of the ocellated skink (Chalcides ocellatus). It has a small head, an elongated cylindrical body and short limbs with five digits on each foot. Females are usually larger than males, and in both sexes the tail may sometimes be broken off or in the process of regeneration. There are 24 to 28 scales around the mid-body. The colour is pale brown, yellowish-brown, or grey, with numerous small black-edged eyespots and usually a paler lateral line running along either side. Juveniles are a darker colour.

Geographic range and habitat
Bedriaga's skink is native to Spain and Portugal. It is largely absent from northern Spain and its distribution is rather patchy elsewhere. It also occurs on the Mediterranean islands of the Islas del Mar Menor and the Isla de Nueva Tabarca and the Atlantic islands of Cies Islands, Pessegueiro Island, Ons Island and Islote de Sancti Petri. Its typical habitat is sandy heathland with scrubby vegetation or sandy areas with more dense vegetation. It can adapt to living in moderately degraded areas.

Subspecies
There are three subspecies:

Behaviour
Bedriaga's skink is a diurnal species and feeds on a wide range of small invertebrates. It has secretive habits and likes to bask in the sun in well-hidden locations. When disturbed it seeks cover in dense undergrowth or under ground, and it can burrow very quickly through loose soil. At breeding time, males become territorial and often fight. Females may mate with more than one male and are viviparous. The gestation period is about eleven weeks after which one to six young are born.

Status
Major threats to this species, C. bedriagai, include modification of its habitat by increased afforestation or coastal development, and increases in the population of the wild boar (Sus scrofa) may have an impact. The population of this skink is believed to be in decline, especially in some island populations, and the IUCN has listed it as being "Near Threatened".

References

Further reading
Boscá E (1880). "Gongylus Bedriagi, Nueva Sub-Especie de la Península Ibérica ". Anales de la Sociedad Española de Historia Natural 9: 495-503. (Gongylus ocellatus bedriagai, new subspecies, p. 503). (in Spanish).

External links
Photos and info 

Chalcides
Endemic reptiles of the Iberian Peninsula
Reptiles described in 1880
Taxa named by Eduardo Boscá